Evin Demir (born 16 February 2001) is a Turkish race walker specialising in the 5000 m and 10,000 m events. She is a native of Sancaktepe in Istanbul, Turkey. She was a member of Sancaktepe Spo, before she was transferred by Enka SK.

Sports career
In 2018, Demir competed in the 5,000 m race walk event of the 2018 European Athletics U18 Championships in Győr, Hungary placing fourth. she took part at the 2018 Summer Youth Olympics in Buenos Aires, Argentina. She placed sixth in the 5,000 m race walk event.

At the 2019 Balkan Race Walking Championships in Alexandroupoli, Greece, Demir captured the gold medal in the 10 km race walk event's U20 category. She won the silver medal in the 10 km event's U20 category of the 2019 European Race Walking Cup held in Alytus, Lithuania, behind her countrywoman Meryem Bekmez. In 2019, she became silver medalist in the 10,000 m event at the European U20 Championships in Borås, Sweden, again behind Bekmez.

Competition record

References

External links

Living people
2001 births
Sportspeople from Istanbul
Turkish female racewalkers
Enkaspor athletes
Athletes (track and field) at the 2018 Summer Youth Olympics
Athletes (track and field) at the 2020 Summer Olympics
Olympic athletes of Turkey